Liua shihi, the Wushan salamander, is a species of salamander in the family Hynobiidae, and is endemic to China. Its natural habitats are subtropical or tropical moist lowland forests, subtropical or tropical moist montane forests, rivers, and freshwater marshes. It is threatened by habitat loss.

References

Asiatic salamanders
Amphibians described in 1950
Taxonomy articles created by Polbot